Apatelodes verena is a moth in the family Apatelodidae. It was first described by Herbert Druce in 1898. It is found in Veracruz, Mexico.

References

Apatelodidae
Moths described in 1898